David Werner (born 1934) is an American author.

David Werner may also refer to:

 David Werner (musician), American singer
 David Werner (real estate investor) (born 1953), American real estate investor

See also
David Warner (disambiguation)